Nantenin Keïta (born 5 November 1984, in Bamako) is a French athlete who competes mainly in Paralympic category T13 sprint events. She is the daughter of the Malian musician Salif Keita and thus a direct descendant of the founder of the Mali Empire, Sundiata Keita. Like her father, she was born with albinism, and is visually impaired.

Competition
She competed in the 2008 Summer Paralympics in Beijing, China.  There she won a silver medal in the women's 200 metre T13 event; won a bronze medal in the women's 400 metre T13; finished fourth in the women's 100 metre T13; and finished fourth in the women's long jump F13.

She also took bronze in the 2012 Summer Paralympics (London) 100 metre T13.

In the 2014 IPC Athletics European Championships in Swansea, she won the gold medal in the women's 400 metre T13. The next year she followed her European success with two medals at the 2015 IPC Athletics World Championships in Doha. She won silver in the T13 100m and took gold in the 400m to add the world title to her accolades. At the 2016 IPC Athletics European Championships she successfully defended her 400m title and added the 100m title too.

References

External links 
 
 

1984 births
Living people
French female sprinters
Paralympic athletes of France
Paralympic gold medalists for France
Paralympic silver medalists for France
Paralympic bronze medalists for France
Medalists at the 2008 Summer Paralympics
Medalists at the 2012 Summer Paralympics
Medalists at the 2016 Summer Paralympics
Athletes (track and field) at the 2008 Summer Paralympics
Athletes (track and field) at the 2012 Summer Paralympics
Athletes (track and field) at the 2016 Summer Paralympics
People with albinism
Nantenin
Paralympic medalists in athletics (track and field)
21st-century French women